Afroeurydemus selmani is a species of leaf beetle of the Democratic Republic of the Congo. It was originally described by Brian J. Selman in 1972 as Afroeurydemus signatus. In 2019, this species became a homonym of Afroeurydemus signatus (Pic, 1940), a species formerly placed in Syagrus and moved to Afroeurydemus by Stefano Zoia. Selman's species was then renamed to Afroeurydemus selmani.

References 

Eumolpinae
Beetles of the Democratic Republic of the Congo
Endemic fauna of the Democratic Republic of the Congo
Beetles described in 1972